Tommy O'Hare (born July 10, 1977) is an American short track speed skater. He competed in the men's 5000 metre relay event at the 1998 Winter Olympics.

References

External links
 

1977 births
Living people
American male short track speed skaters
Olympic short track speed skaters of the United States
Short track speed skaters at the 1998 Winter Olympics
Sportspeople from St. Louis